Andro Enukidze (born January 9, 1965) is a Georgian theater director.

Biography 
Andro Enukidze was born January 9, 1965, in Tbilisi.

He studied under Temur Chkheidze at the Shota Rustaveli Theatre and Film University.  Graduating in 1987, he began his career at chair of acting skills of theatrical institute.

Andro Enukidze puts performances at theaters: Shota Rustaveli's, Kote Mardjanishvili's, and also cooperates with other theaters. He put about 40 performances. Since 2014 he is artistic director in Batumi Ilia Chavchavadze State Theatre.

Together with Robert Sturua co-founder of director's faculty, the first in the history of Turkey (Bilkent University, Ankara). He as the director worked at theaters of Poland and Romania.

Andro Enukidze writes plays too, sometimes together with playwright Miho Mosulishvili which are put at theaters of Georgia and are published in literary magazines.

Performances 
 Macbath by William Shakespeare, Batumi Ilia Chavchavadze State Theatre, 2014
 Play Strindberg by Friedrich Durrenmatt, Rustaveli Theatre, with Robert Sturua, 2009
 Happiness of Irine by David Kldiashvili, Rustaveli theatre, 2007

The first channel of the Georgian television 
 Villain by Jorge Luís Borges, 1998
 My Friend Hitler, the coauthor of the scenario Miho Mosulishvili (based on the play of Yukio Mishima of the same name), 1999.
 Night of Small Stars (45-serial TV series), the coauthor of the scenario with - Miho Mosulishvili, Coba Tskhakaya, Soso Mchedlishvili, Alexander Kokrashvili; - 2000

Awards 
 Award the Ministry of Culture of Georgia for the play "And Tomorrow Premiere", (Coauthor Miho Mosulishvili), 1989
 Award of the Ministry of Culture of Georgia for the play "The Thirteenth Experimental", (Coauthor Miho Mosulishvili), 1991
 "For the best direction" at a festival of the Georgian theaters, 1988
 "For the best direction" at the International festival "Gold Mask" of Tbilisi, 2000
 The Grand Prix at the Dostoyevsky festival in Staraya Russa for the performance 'Dostoevsky.ru' (Based on "Notes from the Dead house" Fyodor Mikhaylovich Dostoyevsky), 2005

External links 
 ANDRO ENUKIDZE TO HEAD BATUMI DRAMA THEATRE
 Blestemata Macbeth
 Uciderea lui Gonzago
 Andro Enukidze on Facebook

1965 births
Living people
Theatre people from Tbilisi
Theatre directors from Georgia (country)
Dramatists and playwrights from Georgia (country)
20th-century dramatists and playwrights from Georgia (country)
21st-century dramatists and playwrights from Georgia (country)